Saşa Yunisoğlu or Sasha Yunisoglu (born 18 December 1985 in Mykolaiv, now Ukraine) is an Azerbaijani footballer.

Career

Club
Yunisoğlu started his career with Azerbaijani side MKT-Araz Imishli. He moved to Dyskobolia of Poland in the summer of 2007, after a match between the two clubs. He debuted in Ekstraklasa in the game versus Zagłębie Lubin on 7 October 2007. He was the second Azerbaijani to have played in Ekstraklasa. Dyskobolia finished third in the 2007-08 Ekstraklasa season.

On 9 January 2009, he returned to Azerbaijan for FC Baku.

In June 2013 Yunisoğlu signed for Sumgayit. However, 2 weeks later Yunisoğlu cancelled his contract with Sumgayit and signed for Turkish side Denizlispor.  
In April 2014 Yunisoğlu left Denizlispor citing un-paided wages. Yunisoğlu was made a free agent when Araz-Naxçıvan folded and withdrew from the Azerbaijan Premier League on 17 November 2014.

After nearly a year without a club, Yunisoğlu signed for Ravan Baku FK on 21 October 2015.

International
Yunisoglu was called by Azerbaijan national football team for the game versus Portugal.

Career statistics

International

Statistics accurate as of match played 7 October 2011

References

External links 
 Profile on FK Baku Official Site
 
 
 

1985 births
Living people
Sportspeople from Mykolaiv
Azerbaijani footballers
Azerbaijan international footballers
Azerbaijani expatriate footballers
Shamakhi FK players
Dyskobolia Grodzisk Wielkopolski players
Polonia Warsaw players
FC Baku players
Gabala FC players
AZAL PFK players
Sumgayit FK players
Denizlispor footballers
Ravan Baku FC players
TFF First League players
Azerbaijan Premier League players
Expatriate footballers in Poland
Azerbaijani expatriate sportspeople in Poland
FK MKT Araz players
Araz-Naxçıvan PFK players
Association football defenders
Neftçi PFK players